The 2013–14 Major Indoor Soccer League season was the third under the United Soccer Leagues banner, fifth under the MISL name, and the sixth season overall. The season began on November 15 and concluded on March 2. Each team played a 20-game schedule. This was the final season for this third incarnation of the MISL. Six of the seven teams joined the Professional Arena Soccer League, later renamed Major Arena Soccer League.

News 
On December 4, the MISL Board of Governors approved video review of three-point goals. The decision states: "Referees will be able to use the reviews to determine the position of the ball in relation to the 3-point arc when the ball was struck. Reviews will not be used to determine if the ball crossed the goal line." The first game the new system was available was the December 6 game between the Pennsylvania Roar and the Rochester Lancers.

Teams and arenas

New Teams

Teams that left the MISL

Stadiums and locations

Managerial changes

Results table 

MISL published schedule and results.

Standings

Updated to matches played on 3/2/2014

Statistics

Top scorers

Last updated on March 4, 2014. Source: MISL.com Statistics - Total Points

Top 2pt Goal Scorers

Last updated on March 2, 2014. Source: MISL.com Statistics - Total Points

Playoffs
The MISL Playoffs will begin with the semifinals, featuring the No. 1 and No. 4 seeds and the No. 2 and No. 3 seeds meeting in home-and-home series with a 15-minute mini game to decide the series following the second game if needed.  The championship will follow the same format. The higher seed will have the option to choose which game it hosts.

Semi-finals

Game 1

Game 2

Mini-Game Tie Breaker

MISL Finals

Game 1

Game 2

Mini-Game Tie Breaker

Awards

Individual Awards

All-League First Team

All-League Second Team

All-Rookie Team

References

Major Indoor Soccer League (2008–2014) seasons
Major Indoor Soccer League
Major Indoor Soccer League